Yohani Diloka de Silva (born 30 July 1993) is a Sri Lankan singer-songwriter, rapper, record producer, and YouTuber. She started her music career as a YouTuber. She soon gained recognition for her rap cover of 'Deviyange Bare' and released many covers of her singing and rapping which have earned her the title "Rap Princess" of Sri Lanka. She rose to prominence and gained global recognition for her cover of "Manike Mage Hithe". She also became the first Sri Lankan female singer to surpass a total of 3.60 million subscribers on YouTube.

Personal life 
Yohani was born on 30 July 1993 in Colombo, Sri Lanka. She is the daughter of a former Army officer Major General Prasanna de Silva. Her mother Dinithi de Silva, was a former cabin crew member at Sri Lankan Airlines. She is a Buddhist and has practiced Buddhism since her early life. Yohani has one younger sister, Shavindri de Silva, who is currently studying medicine. Due to their father's military background, both girls grew up in different Army bases in Sri Lanka.

Yohani's interest and practice in music began early in her life, and it was her mother who identified her keenness and prompted her to pursue this passion at a young age. She grew up surrounded by her parents' love of music as they often listened to the BeeGees, Spice Girls, AR Rahman and Elton John.She completed her higher education in Logistics Management and Professional Accounting from the General Sir John Kotelawala Defence University prior to pursuing her career as an artist. She also obtained a master's degree in accounting from CQUniversity Australia.

Career 

Yohani's music career took centre stage upon her return to Sri Lanka in March 2019. She joined Pettah Effect, a record label that was co-founded by Dilanjan, and had much young talent running the show. In February 2020, Prima Kottu Mee signed Yohani as their Brand Ambassador for two years, as one of her first-ever significant brand endorsements. In the months that followed, Yohani got signed by Red Bull Records, with her debut single "Aaye" premiering in August 2020. The latter part of 2020 saw new releases. The second being Sitha Dawuna a collaboration with Chamath Sangeeth in September 2020.

The third being a song that reverberated with citizens who endured a 30-year war on the island. She got 200 million views for a YouTube video "Manike Mage Hithe" cover song in May 2021. She had also completed her debut Sinhala album which features twelve songs and plans to launch it during a live concert around December 2021.

She made her debut overseas tour as a music artiste to Hyderabad in India in October 2021 for a live concert with her band. On this tour, she joined two of India's most popular television shows, Salman Khan's Bigg Boss 15 and Ranveer Singh's Big Picture as a guest. While her song Manike Mage Hithe became popular, she released the first single from her first music album, "Kella", which was "Ithin Aadare".

She then contributed her voice to the official song of the T20 Cricket World Cup in Sri Lanka in 2021 and released her first international single "Moving On" in English under the world famous music label Red Bull Records. This made her the only Sri Lankan singer to release a song under Red Bull Records. 

During her visit to India, she was honored with the post of Indo-Ceylon Cultural Ambassador by the Government of India. She then performed "Unmada Prema Geeya" with popular Sri Lankan singers Bhathiya and Santhush and Kaizer Kaiz. In December 2021, she participated in the Dubai Expo 2020, later on contributing to the official song of LPL 2021 along with many popular singers of Sri Lanka. 

The Tamil-Sinhala song "Rider Fighter"  with ADK was released in the same month. In January 2022, she contributed a Tamil song composed by Harris Jayaraj and the Telugu song "What's happening" in the Telugu film Dhamaka composed by Bhima Cericeleo.That month, she was anointed Sri Lankan of the year by LMD magazine. 

In February 2022, she contributed to the song "Gajaman Nona" with Tehan Perera under the direction of Sandesh Bandara. After that she did a lot of work with the Dubai media and in between she contributed to sing the Hindi version of her world famous song "Manike Mage Hite".  She then released the patriotic song "You Are My Paradise" under the foundation So Sri Lanka. It contributed to the promotion of the tourism industry in Sri Lanka. 

She then attended the Dubai Expo 2020 where she performed the biggest music concert ever held in Dubai Millennium Amphitheater with a huge crowd. A few more concerts were held in Dubai and then in March 2022, she, Chamath Sangeeth, Satheeshan and Dulan ARX will win the SLIM Award for the most popular song of the year. She also hostsed a YouTube concert called Eden with Lunu and in March 2022 she performed the Yohani Live In Concert in Muscat, Oman.

In April 2022, she joined T-Series, the music label that owns the world's largest YouTube channel. In the face of the severe economic crisis in Sri Lanka that month, She established the "I am for Sri Lanka" foundation and contributed money to the treatment of people who were injured in the freedom struggle in Sri Lanka, and to the lack of medical equipment in the country at that time. She collected 5000 US dollars under that foundation and gave it to the Red Cross organization and thus fulfilled the related tasks.

Sri Lankans boycotted her saying that her foundation was related to the existing government and therefore she remained silent for several months. After a long silence of a few months, she was back in the limelight with the Hindi remake of "Manike Mage Hithe", named "Manike".

It is a golden landmark in Sri Lankan music- since the Sinhala language was also included in the film song, "Manike Mage Hithe" became the first Hindi song to include Sinhala. Tanishk Bagchi and Chamath Sangeeth composed the song and  Rashmi Virag , Dulan ARX and Mellow D penned the lyrics of the song. Along with Yohani, India's one of the most popular singer Jubin Nautial &  Surya Raghunaathan featured in the song. The song was featured in the bollywood movie Thank God which released in October 2022 and featured Indian actor Siddharth Malhotra along with Nora Fatehi.
Siddharth Malhotra, Ajay Devgan and Rakul Preet Singh star in Thank God. The song gained popularity on Indian social media.

Her First Indian Song was "Po Po Po ", a Tamil song in the film The Legend. The indian actress who gave her voice for the first time was Urvashi Rautela who acted in that film.

For promoting the movie Thank God, she featured on India's most popular entertainment show The Kapil Sharma Show as a guest on Diwali. She then left for the Maldives where she participated in Chanaacha 2022. Also, she appeared for Sampath Bank's WePay advertisement. 

On November 10, 2022, she crossed the one million followers mark on her Instagram account, making her the third Sri Lankan celebrity to reach one million followers. The other two are Piyumi Hansamali and Dinakshi Priyasad.

In 2023, she contributed her vocals to the remake of the song "Jheda Nasha" which featured in the bollywood film An Action Hero. Nora Fatehi  danced along with Indian actor Ayushmann Khurrana for that song. 

Her third Hindi song and her first non-film Hindi song "Tu Samane Aaye" was released in November 2022. Jubin Nautiyal contribute his vocals along with Yohani in this song. 

Then she released the song "Chaudhary" in January 2023. Popular Rajasthani singer Mame Khan and Jubin Nautiyal contributed their vocals along with Yohani. In February 2023, Don & D Entertainment organized two grand musical concerts of veteran bollywood singer Udit Narayan in Melbourne and Sydney, Australia. Yohani also featured in these concerts. She held two more concerts in Kolkata and Raipur, India.

Months later, she again performed a song in Sinhala titled "Medusa" on March 4. Here she sang with the new singer Warunah.

Upcoming - A Collaborate with Guru Randhawa , A Collaborate with  Shreya Ghoshal.

Discography

Non-film songs

Film songs

References 

1993 births
Living people
People from Colombo
Sri Lankan Buddhists
Sri Lankan singer-songwriters
Sri Lankan rappers
Sri Lankan businesspeople
Sri Lankan YouTubers
Alumni of General Sir John Kotelawala Defence University
Central Queensland University alumni
Bollywood playback singers
Expatriate musicians in India
Sri Lankan expatriates in India
Sri Lankan expatriates in Australia
21st-century Sri Lankan women singers